Seidman is a Jewish surname. Notable people with the surname include:

 Dov Seidman (born 1964), American author and businessman 
 Harold Seidman (1911–2002), American political scientist
 Herbert Seidman (1920–1995), American chess player
 Jonathan Seidman, American professor
 Judith Seidman (born 1950), Canadian politician 
 Lewis William Seidman (1921–2009), American economist
 Mike Seidman (born 1981), American football player
 Naomi Seidman, Jewish professor
 Ricki Seidman (born 1955), American politician
 Robert B. Seidman (1920–2014), American scholar
 Steven Seidman (born 1948), American sociologist and author

See also 
 Seidman (disambiguation)

References 

Jewish surnames